Kim Dong-hyun (born 11 June 1997) is a South Korean footballer who plays as a midfielder for Gimcheon Sangmu and the South Korea national team.

Career statistics

Club

Notes

References

1997 births
Living people
Footballers from Seoul
South Korean footballers
South Korea under-20 international footballers
South Korea under-23 international footballers
Association football midfielders
K League 2 players
K League 1 players
Pohang Steelers players
Gwangju FC players
Seongnam FC players
Gangwon FC players
Footballers at the 2020 Summer Olympics
Olympic footballers of South Korea